The 1908 United States presidential election in Indiana took place on November 3, 1908. Voters chose 15 representatives, or electors to the Electoral College, who voted for president and vice president.

Indiana voted for the Republican nominee, Secretary of War William Howard Taft, over the Democratic nominee, former U.S. Representative William Jennings Bryan. Taft won the state by a narrow margin of 1.49%.

Results

See also
 United States presidential elections in Indiana

References

Indiana
1908
1908 Indiana elections